Kirill Yuryevich Eskov (born 16 September 1956) is a Russian writer, biologist and paleontologist.
As an author he is known for The Gospel of Afranius in which he presents an atheistic interpretation of the events of the Gospel, and The Last Ringbearer in which he retells J. R. R. Tolkien's The Lord of the Rings from a Mordorian point of view.

Career

In biology 

Eskov graduated from the Department of Biology of Moscow State University in 1979. In 1986 he defended a dissertation for the Candidate of Biological Sciences at the A.N. Severtsov Institute of Animal Evolutionary Morphology and Ecology of the USSR Academy of Sciences, the theme being "Spiders of Northern Siberia (horology analysis)". His main scientific interests as a biologist focus on the spiders of Siberia and the Russian Far East and, as a paleontologist, on the Paleozoic and Cenozoic eras.  he is the Senior Researcher at the Laboratory of Arthropods of the Paleontological Institute of Russian Academy of Sciences and vice-president of the Eurasian Arachnological Society. He has worked at the institute since 1988.  he had 86 scientific publications.

Eskov has discovered several new genera of spiders. Among seven that he discovered in 1988 is Kikimora palustris Eskov, 1988 It belongs to the family Linyphiidae, and is found in Russia and Finland. The name translates from Latin as "marsh Kikimora". (Kikimora is a female spirit in Slavic mythology and the Russian phrase кикимора болотная (kikimora bolotnaya, "marsh kikimora") is well known in the Russian language.) 
He has named a genus of linyphiid spiders  Sauron after the Tolkien character.

He is the author of the book History of the Earth and its lifeforms (Moscow, 2008), intended as a biology textbook for high schools.

As an author 
As a fiction writer he has published several books, one of the most famous being The Last Ringbearer, an alternative retelling of (or sequel to) J. R. R. Tolkien's The Lord of the Rings, as told from the point of view of Sauron's forces in light of the proverb "History is written by the victors." The book was "published to acclaim" in his homeland in 1999. Translations of the book have also appeared in other European nations, but fear of the vigilant and litigious Tolkien estate has heretofore prevented its publication in English." In late 2010, however, an English translation approved by Eskov was posted on LiveJournal. The American journalist Laura Miller characterised The Last Ringbearer as "a well-written, energetic adventure yarn that offers an intriguing gloss on what some critics have described as the overly simplistic morality of Tolkien's masterpiece."

Other books by Eskov include The Gospel of Afranius, a dramatic portrayal of Jesus. In this work he presents a demythologised account of the events of the Gospels.

Selected scientific publications

Footnotes

External links
 The Back Story to the Last Ring-bearer, by Dr. Kirill Eskov
 Translator's blog
 Kirill Eskov's blog
 Short biography at the Paleontological Institute
 List of publications on his personal page at the Laboratory
 Critique
 His books in the Lib.ru.

1956 births
Moscow State University alumni
Arachnologists
Russian fantasy writers
Russian science fiction writers
Russian biologists
Russian paleontologists
Soviet biologists
20th-century biologists
Soviet paleontologists
Tolkien fandom
Writers from Moscow
Living people